This is a list of African countries and dependencies by population density in inhabitants/km2. Saint Helena, being closest to Africa, has been included.

See also
List of African countries by population
List of African countries by GDP
Demographics of Africa

References

Population Density
Africa
Africa